James "Jim" Jacks (December 29, 1947 – January 20, 2014) was an American film producer of several blockbuster films, and was also known for cultivating visionary independent film auteurs, having produced the first Hollywood films of Richard Linklater, Joel and Ethan Coen, and Kevin Smith.

Born December 29, 1947, Jacks grew up in a military family. He graduated from Carnegie Mellon University with a B.S. in Industrial Engineering and from Cornell University with an MBA. He was working as a Wall Street financial analyst when he decided to be a screenwriter. Unsuccessful, he became head of production at Circle Films in the early- to mid-1980s and then senior vice-president of production at Universal Studios from the late-1980s into the early-1990s. In 1992, he became an independent producer with Alphaville Films, which he co-founded with Sean Daniel. He left Alphaville Films in 2004.

The shrimp parmigiana at the Los Angeles restaurant Dan Tana's is named for him.

Jacks died on January 20, 2014, of a heart attack at his Los Angeles home at the age of 66.

Selected filmography
He was a producer in all films unless otherwise noted.

Film

Thanks

Television

References

External links
 
 
 Rest in Peace, Mr. Mallrats... by Kevin Smith
 James Jacks at Find a Grave

1947 births
2014 deaths
American film producers
Burials at Forest Lawn Memorial Park (Hollywood Hills)
Carnegie Mellon University College of Engineering alumni
Samuel Curtis Johnson Graduate School of Management alumni